Aguas Cándidas is a municipality and town located in the province of Burgos, Castile and León, Spain. According to the 2004 census (INE), the municipality had a population of 97 inhabitants.

The municipality of Aguas Cándidas is made up of three towns: Aguas Cándidas, Quintanaopio and Río Quintanilla (seat or capital).

References

External links
Aguas Cándidas - La Puerta del Valle de las Caderechas 

Municipalities in the Province of Burgos